or Magical Taruroute is a Japanese manga series by Tatsuya Egawa, published in Shueisha's Weekly Shōnen Jump from 1988 to 1992, spanning a 21-volume collected edition. It was adapted into an anime television series that lasted 87 episodes and three feature films from 1991 through 1992.

Plot
In Tokyo, there lived an outcast fifth grader (now sixth grader a year later) named Honmaru Edojo (voiced by Minami Takayama) who is a naughty youngster who is one of the most trodden-upon losers in his class, until the time he meets Magical Taruruto (voiced by Tarako). Taruruto's powers help him deal with all his hardships, such as girls, bullies, and numerous other challenges. At the end of the series, Honmaru graduates from Nanno Elementary and enters middle school along with his only crush Iona Kawai.

Anime 
The Magical Taruruto TV series started on September 2, 1990, and ended on May 10, 1992. There are a total of 87 episodes. The series was produced by Toei, Asahi Broadcasting Corporation, and Asatsu and animated by Toei Animation.

Episodes

Video games
During the series' run, multiple video games based on the Magical Taruruto series were released in the early 1990s. These include games for the Famicom, Super Famicom, Game Boy, Mega Drive, and Game Gear.

The series was also represented in some cross-over games like Famicom Jump II: Saikyō no Shichinin, and Cult Jump.

Trivia
 According to the creator of the series, the terminology of Taruruto's name, which can also be rendered into the Latin alphabet as "Taruroute", consists of the Japanese word "taru" (足る, to be sufficient) and the English word "route" and refers to a Zen proverb about staying in control over one's own desires.

References

External links

Official page for the Japanese DVD collection 
English site from Toei Animation
Hitoshi Doi's Magical Taruruto Website

1988 manga
1990 anime television series debuts
1991 video games
1992 video games
Asahi Broadcasting Corporation original programming
Game Boy games
Bandai games
Game Freak games
Japan-exclusive video games
Sega video games
Shōnen manga
Shueisha manga
TV Asahi original programming
Tatsuya Egawa
Toei Animation television